The Slava Metreveli Central Stadium (Tsentralnyi Stadion imeni Slavy Metreveli) is a multi-purpose stadium in Sochi, Russia, named after the Soviet footballer. It is used mostly for football matches and sometimes in other sports disciplines.

The stadium was opened 19 April 1964 football match between Syria and the RSFSR

The stadium seats 10,200 people.

Record attendance is set to 1/16 final match between the teams of the Cup of Russia FC Zhemchuzhina-Sochi and Rostov (Rostov-on-Don) (1:2, 17 July 2011)

On 3 December 2010 the stadium was visited by Russian Prime Minister Vladimir Putin for the first time.

International matches

References

External links
 Website about Federal State Unitary Enterprise "South Sports"

Football venues in Russia
Sport in Sochi
FC Zhemchuzhina Sochi
Multi-purpose stadiums in Russia
Khostinsky City District
Buildings and structures in Sochi